The Chicago Smash is a World TeamTennis (WTT) franchise founded in 2020, owned by the league. The team was the third expansion teams in two years to enter the league in 2020 following the addition of the Orlando Storm and Vegas Rollers during the 2019 season. The Chicago Smash will play their home matches at the Credit Union 1 Arena in Chicago, Illinois.

Team rosters

2020 roster
 Sloane Stephens
 Bethanie Mattek-Sands
 Evan King
 Rajeev Ram
 Eugenie Bouchard
 Brandon Nakashima
 Head Coach, Kamau Murray

References

External links
 

Sports teams in Chicago
World TeamTennis teams
Sports clubs established in 2020
2020 establishments in Illinois